Pádraig Ághas (born Patrick Ashe; 28 April 1885 – 22 December 1966) was an Irish schoolteacher, writer and independent politician.

Ághas was born in Lispole, Dingle Peninsula, County Kerry, the son of Matthew (Maitiú), a farmer, and Mary O'Sullivan (Máire Ní Shúilleabháin). He was a cousin of Thomas Ashe, a fellow Gaelic enthusiast. Pádraig was educated at the local Irish school in Lispole, where the Gaelic language had returned to the curriculum. His interest in the language was furthered during his time at the Institute of Education in Dingle (1900–1904).

From 1905 to 1910, he was an Irish teacher in Lismore, County Waterford and at De La Salle College Waterford from 1910 to 1912. He then taught in Doonbeg, County Clare, from 1912 to 1950. He was then encouraged to run for  the Seanad Éireann by his cousin, and was elected to the 7th Seanad in 1951 by the Labour Panel. He served from 1951 to 1954. He did not contest the 1954 Seanad election.

Between 1919 and 1932, he published a number of short stories, poems and essays in Irish in various journals, including An Scuab, Misneach, Irish Fun, Fáinne an Lae and An Claidheamh Soluis. He also wrote a play for children, Sgéalta scoile.

He married Helen Sullivan, a fellow schoolteacher, in 1916. Late in life, he and his wife moved to  Oranmore, County Galway, where he died in 1966. He was buried in Doonbeg.

References

1885 births
1966 deaths
Independent members of Seanad Éireann
Irish schoolteachers
20th-century Irish poets
20th-century Irish writers
Members of the 7th Seanad
Politicians from County Kerry